Brahim Kaazouzi (born 15 June 1990) is a Moroccan middle-distance runner who specialises in the 1500 metres. He represented his country at the 2016 Summer Olympics.
He broke into the world's top 100 athletes in the 2014 season. He gained selection for Morocco at the 2016 Summer Olympics through a former personal best run of 3:35.76 minutes in 2016.

He has qualified to represent Morocco at the 2020 Summer Olympics.

Personal bests
Outdoor
1500 metres – 3:33.22 min (Rabat 2018)
3000 metres – 7:41.88 min (Rabat 2017)
5000 metres – 13:16.98 min (Carquefou 2017)
Indoor
1500 metres – 3:36.95 min (Liévin 2018)
3000 metres – 7:50.33 min (Metz 2017)

All information from All Athletics.

International competitions

1Did not start in the final

References

External links
 
 
 
 

Living people
1990 births
Moroccan male middle-distance runners
Moroccan male long-distance runners
Olympic athletes of Morocco
Athletes (track and field) at the 2016 Summer Olympics
World Athletics Championships athletes for Morocco
Mediterranean Games gold medalists for Morocco
Mediterranean Games medalists in athletics
Athletes (track and field) at the 2018 Mediterranean Games
Mediterranean Games gold medalists in athletics
Islamic Solidarity Games competitors for Morocco
20th-century Moroccan people
21st-century Moroccan people